My Name Will Live On is the fourth album by Italian heavy metal band Doomsword, released in 2007. The album cover art is Vercingetorix Surrenders to Caesar, by Lionel Royer used with permission.

Track listing

References

External links 
https://www.sputnikmusic.com/soundoff.php?albumid=32309#a

2007 albums
Doomsword albums